Aonobuaka is a village on Abaiang, atoll in Kiribati. There are 328 residents of the village (2010 census). It is to the north of Koinawa and Morikao and to the south of Borotiam.

References

Populated places in Kiribati